Ashaghi Govhar Agha Mosque is a mosque in Shusha, Azerbaijan.

The designation ashaghi ("lower") refers to the location of the mosque in the lower section of Shusha town, distinguishing it from the Yukhari Govhar Agha Mosque, the similarly named mosque located in the upper section of the town.

History
Construction of Ashaghi Govhar Agha Mosque was completed with orders of Govhar Agha, daughter of Ibrahim Khalil Khan of Karabakh Khanate approximately 8 years before the Yukhari Govhar Agha Mosque was built. A difference between the Ashaghi Govhar Agha and Yukhari Govhar Agha is that the minarets of the former are located at the corners of the rear facade and the minarets of the Yukhari Govhar Agha mosque are on the front facade.

As of 2005–2007, the mosque was reportedly in semi-destroyed state. Although it has been claimed that the mosque was renovated, members of an Azerbaijani delegation visiting Karabakh took photos and claimed that the mosque is still badly damaged and no renovation works are being done.

Gallery

References

Mosques completed in 1876
Mosques in Shusha
Karbalayi Safikhan Karabakhi buildings and structures